Suli Darreh Darbahan (also Romanized as Sūlī Darreh Darbahān; also known as Sūleh Dar, Solāḩ Darreh, Sulah Darreh, Sulakh-Darrekh, and Sūlī Darbahān) is a village in Qaqazan-e Gharbi Rural District, in the Central District of Takestan County, Qazvin Province, Iran. At the 2006 census, its population was 106, in 20 families.

References 

Populated places in Takestan County